Goal (Spanish:¡Goal!) is a 1936 Argentine sports film directed by Luis Moglia Barth.

The film's sets were designed by Raúl Soldi.

Cast
 Severo Fernández
 Sofía Bozán
 Héctor Calcaño 
 Marisa Cobián
 Inés Edmonson 
 Pedro Fiorito 
 Miguel Gómez Bao
 Pedro Quartucci 
 Teresa Serrador
 Marino Seré

References

Bibliography 
 Jan Tilman Schwab. Fussball im Film: Lexikon des Fussballfilms, Volume 2. Belleville, 2006.

External links 
 

1936 films
Argentine sports films
1930s sports films
1930s Spanish-language films
Films directed by Luis Moglia Barth
Argentine black-and-white films
1930s Argentine films